Protocobitis is a genus of loaches endemic to Guangxi in China and living in caves.

Species
There are currently three recognized species in this genus:
 Protocobitis anteroventris J. H. Lan, 2013
 Protocobitis polylepis Y. Zhu, Y. J. Lu, J. X. Yang & S. Zhang, 2008
 Protocobitis typhlops J. X. Yang & Y. R. Chen, 1993

References 
 Kottelat, M. (2012): Conspectus cobitidum: an inventory of the loaches of the world (Teleostei: Cypriniformes: Cobitoidei).  The Raffles Bulletin of Zoology, Suppl. No. 26: 1-199.

Cave fish
Cobitidae
Taxonomy articles created by Polbot